The World and the Flesh is a 1932 American pre-Code drama film directed by John Cromwell and written by Oliver H.P. Garrett. The film stars George Bancroft, Miriam Hopkins, Alan Mowbray, George E. Stone, Mitchell Lewis, Max Wagner and Harry Cording. The film was released on April 22, 1932, by Paramount Pictures.

Plot
“A soldier of fortune risks his life to save a rich girl’s friends during Russian Revolution—at a price!”

Cast
George Bancroft as Kylenko
Miriam Hopkins as Maria Yaskaya
Alan Mowbray as Dimitri
George E. Stone as Rutchkin
Mitchell Lewis as Sukhanov
Max Wagner as Vorobiov
Harry Cording as Ivanovitch
Emmett Corrigan as Gen. Spiro
Oscar Apfel as Banker
Reginald Barlow as Markov

Footnotes

References
Canham, Kingsley. 1976. The Hollywood Professionals, Volume 5: King Vidor, John Cromwell, Mervyn LeRoy. The Tantivy Press, London.

External links 
 

1932 films
American drama films
1932 drama films
Paramount Pictures films
Films directed by John Cromwell
American black-and-white films
1930s English-language films
1930s American films